Paulina Singerman Begun (1911 – 9 February 1984) was an Argentine actress and businesswoman who primarily worked during the Golden Age of Argentine Cinema, performing on both stage and in films. In the later part of her career, she spent a decade performing for television. She was the younger sister of actress Berta Singerman. In 1981, she was awarded both a Diploma of Merit and a Platinum Konex for her comedy work in film and theatre.

Biography 
Paulina Singerman Begun was born in 1911 in Buenos Aires to a Russian Jewish immigrant family. From an early age, Singerman and her sister Berta and their neighbour, Amelia Bence performed with other neighbourhood children in the courtyards of their homes. It was actually Paulina who suggested to Bence's mother that she should take acting classes at the Lavardén Children's Theater, operating in the Teatro Colón, where Singerman was studying.

At the age of 14, she entered the Conservatorio Nacional de Música y Arte Escénico (National Conservatory of Music and Performing Arts). Her theatre debut was in Una cura de reposo in 1927 when she appeared on stage with Florencio Parravicini in a play by Enrique Garcia Velloso.

By 1932, she had formed her own theatre company, and was performing dramatic works such as Taming of the Shrew and Amor. She married the businessman José "Pepe" Vázquez, who became her business manager and they had twin sons. Their company toured from Latin America to the United States, in Cuba, Portugal, and Spain.

In 1936, they were in Mexico producing a play called Brujería by Oduvaldo Vianna at the Teatro Arbeu and it was followed by a production of Amor at the same theatre. In 1937, they were travelling and performing in the US. Plays included Todo Un Hombre, Amor, Terra Baja, and Cuando Los Hijos de Eva no son Lo Hijos de Adan. Then they headed to Rio de Janeiro before making their way back to Buenos Aires at the beginning of 1938.

In 1938, Singerman starred in her first film, La rubia del camino directed by Manuel Romero and received accolades as a comedian. She then made Retazo (1939), Caprichosa y millonaria (1940) directed by Enrique Santos Discepolo, Isabelita (1940) directed by Manuel Romero, Un bebé de París (1941), Mi amor eres tú (1941) and others ending with Hay que casar a Paulina (1944). In all, she made 10 films in short order most following the same pattern, comedies, and either had the theme of an unruly woman being tamed or a rich woman falling for a poor man. In Elvira Fernández, vendedora de tiendas (1942), one of her best known films, Singerman played the daughter of a millionaire store owner who organises a worker strike.

When Juan Perón came to power, she was exiled  and returned to touring, which served to enhance her reputation. She toured Spain and South America producing such plays as Aquí estoy y aquí me quedo, Constancia, Mujeres, Querido Coco, Rosas amarillas y rosas rojas, Trece a la mesa, Una noche a la italiana among others.

When her exile ended she returned to Argentina and continued to act on stage starring in Fiddler on the Roof in 1969 as Golde, the fiddler's wife. At the dawn of the 1970s, she began acting on television and played numerous roles in series and made for TV movies.

In 1972, she starred in Pan criollo, junto a Luis Sandrini a play by César Tiempo. Her last television program was Una noche a la italiana made in 1979.

Death 
Paulina Singerman died on 9 February 1984 in Buenos Aires, aged 72 or 73.

Awards 
 1981 Platinum Konex for Comedy in film and theater Konex Foundation
 1981 Diploma of Merit for Comedy in film and theater Konex Foundation

Selected filmography

Films 
 La rubia del camino (1938)
 Caprichosa y millonaria (1940)
 Isabelita (1940)
 You Are My Love (1941)
 Elvira Fernández, vendedora de tiendas (1942)
 Luisito (1943)
 Hay que casar a Paulina (1944)

Television 
 Viernes de Pacheco (1970)
 Historias de mamá y papá (1970–1973)
 Alta comedia (TV Series) (1971)
 Pan criollo (1972)
 Qué vida de locos! (1973)
 Humor a la italiana (1974)
 La comedia brillante (1974)
 Constancia, una esposa constante (TV Movie) (1976)
 Una noche a la italiana (1979)

References

External links 

 

1911 births
1984 deaths
Argentine film actresses
Argentine people of Russian-Jewish descent
Argentine stage actresses
Actresses from Buenos Aires
Jewish Argentine actresses
20th-century Argentine actresses